Jean Fiacre Kouamé Botué (born 10 September 2002) is a professional footballer who plays as a forward for  club Ajaccio. Born in the Ivory Coast, he represents the Burkina Faso national team.

Club career
Botué signed with Ajaccio on 16 February 2021 from USFA in Burkina Faso. Botué made his debut with Ajaccio in a 1–1 Ligue 2 win over Valenciennes on 3 April 2021.

International career
Botué was born in the Ivory Coast and raised in Burkina Faso, and is of Burkinabé descent through his mother.  Botué represented the Burkina Faso U20s at the 2019 and 2021 Africa U-20 Cup of Nations. He debuted with the senior Burkina Faso national team in a 0–0 2022 FIFA World Cup qualification tie with Algeria on 7 September 2021.

References

External links
 
 
 

2002 births
Living people
Footballers from Abidjan
Citizens of Burkina Faso through descent
Burkinabé footballers
Burkina Faso international footballers
Burkina Faso youth international footballers
Ivorian footballers
Ivorian people of Burkinabé descent
Sportspeople of Burkinabé descent
Association football forwards
AC Ajaccio players
Ligue 1 players
Ligue 2 players
Championnat National 2 players
Burkinabé expatriate footballers
Burkinabé expatriates in France
Ivorian expatriate footballers
Ivorian expatriates in France
Expatriate footballers in France
21st-century Burkinabé people
2021 Africa Cup of Nations players
Burkina Faso under-20 international footballers